The Incredible 2-Headed Transplant is a 1971 science fiction/horror film directed by Anthony Lanza.  It is sometimes confused with the 1972 blaxploitation film The Thing with Two Heads.

Plot

Dr. Roger Girard (Bruce Dern) is a wealthy scientist experimenting with head transplantation. His caretaker has a son named Danny (John Bloom) who is an extremely strong full-grown man, but he has the mind of a child due to brain damage sustained in a mine accident. In an unusual turn of events, Manuel Cass (Albert Cole), a recently escaped mental patient and serial killer, has murdered Dr. Girard's caretaker and is seriously injured himself. Given an unprecedented chance to use human subjects – a mortally wounded psychotic and a disabled man with little chance of surviving on his own, neither of whom he thinks will be missed – Dr. Girard transplants Cass's head onto Danny's body to prove that his techniques can be applied to human beings. The new creature, with one head of a murderer and the other with the mental capacity of an eight-year-old attached to an extremely powerful body, escapes and wreaks havoc, committing multiple murders.

After the creature kidnaps Linda Girard (Pat Priest), Dr. Girard, Dr. Max, (Berry Kroeger) and Dr. Anderson (Casey Kasem) pursue it to an abandoned mine.  Anderson rescues Linda, but Dr. Girard, Max, and the creature die in a mine cave-in.

Cast
 Bruce Dern as Dr. Roger Girard 
 Pat Priest as Linda Girard
 Casey Kasem as Dr. Ken Anderson
 Albert Cole as Manuel Cass
 John Bloom as Danny Norton
 Leslie Cole as Young Danny
 Berry Kroeger Dr. Max 
 Larry Vincent as Andrew Norton
 Jack Lester as the Sheriff
 Jerry Patterson as the Deputy
 Darlene Duralia as Miss Pierce
 Raymond Thorne as Motorcyclist #1
 Gary Kent as Motorcyclist #2
 Mary Ellen Clawsen as Female Motorcyclist
 Janice P. Gelman as Teenage victim
 Mike Espe as Teenage victim 
 Andrew Schneider as Teenager
 Eva Sorensen as Teenager

Production
The film was shot in six days in Santa Clarita, California. Lead actor Bruce Dern claimed he never got paid for his services.

Reception
Variety called the film "rank exploitation fodder" directed "lifelessly," though it called the makeup and design of the two-headed creature "good." Gene Siskel of the Chicago Tribune gave the film 1 star out 4, writing that if the film "had focused more on the conflict of the two heads with, say, some extended conversations in close-up, it could have been one of the great bad movies. Instead, we get repetitive shots of the killer drooling while the giant whines 'no, no.'" Kevin Thomas of the Los Angeles Times called the film "lots of fun because this AIP release has been so thoroughly worked out, with good, legitimate performances, logical plot development and taut directing and editing." David McGillivray of The Monthly Film Bulletin wrote, "Uproarious nonsense, looking very much like a piece of low budget Fifties horror and performed with very little finesse, but quite watchable none the less."

In popular culture
In 1989, horror punk band Haunted Garage recorded a song of the same title based on the film for their 7" EP Mothers Day.

See also
 List of American films of 1971

References

External links
 

1971 films
1971 horror films
1970s science fiction horror films
American science fiction horror films
American International Pictures films
Films about organ transplantation
Mad scientist films
Films about father–son relationships
1970s English-language films
1970s American films